The A-Fields (Audrey, Ann, Alison and Annabel) are natural gas reservoirs and gas production facilities in the southern North Sea; about 123 km east of Spurn Head, Yorkshire. The fields produced natural gas from 1988 to 2016.

The A-fields 
The Ann gas field was discovered as early as May 1966 and Audrey in March 1976 but there was limited local infrastructure to transport gas to shore. The Lincolnshire Offshore Gas Gathering System (LOGGS) was commissioned in 1988 and designed to act as a hub and central gas processing, compression and transport facility for the area. Gas from LOGGS was routed to the Theddlethorpe gas terminal.

The Audrey field is located in the UK Offshore Blocks 49/11a and 49/15a. The field was initially developed and operated by Phillips Petroleum Co. Ltd., later ConocoPhillips, then by Spirit Energy. The Ann field is in Block 49/06 and 48/10a and was developed by Phillips, later ConocoPhillips, then by Spirit Energy. Alison in Block 49/11a was originally licensed to Phillips. Annabel was in Block 48/10a and was also originally licensed to Phillips, it was designed to produce gas from the Saturn gas field.

The gas reservoirs in the A-Fields are Upper Leman Sandstone Formation of the Lower Permian Rotliegend Group.

Phillips had assigned the letter ‘A’ to the license; all the prospects were given female names starting with ‘A’.

Development 
The A-Fields were developed by a number of platforms, subsea structures and pipelines.

The design parameters of the Audrey and Ann production facilities are summarised in the table.    

The design parameters of the Alison, Annabel and Ensign production facilities are summarised in the table.   

In addition to the gas production pipelines there were also 3-inch methanol pipelines from  LOGGS to Audrey A and B and to Ensign. There were also control umbilicals to the subsea wellheads.

Gas production 
A summary of the key gas production data for the A-Fields is shown in the table.

The gas production profile, in mcm/y, for Audrey is as shown.

Decommissioning 
The Alison and Ann fields had reached the end of their economic lives in 2010 and 2012 and were closed-in. Audrey was shut down in 2016. Ensign was still operating but the closure of LOGGS and Theddlethorpe gas terminal in August 2018 closed the gas export route; when no alternative export route was found the Ensign installation was decommissioned.

See also 

 List of oil and gas fields of the North Sea
 Theddlethorpe Gas Terminal
 Lincolnshire Offshore Gas Gathering System
 Easington Catchment Area
 Planets gas fields

References 

Natural gas fields in the United Kingdom
North Sea energy